An Nadirah District is a district of the Ibb Governorate, Yemen. As of 2003, the district had a population of 73,755 inhabitants.

References

Districts of Ibb Governorate
An Nadirah District